Arkas Spor Izmir is a professional volleyball team based in Izmir, Turkey. It plays in the Turkish Men's Volleyball League and in the CEV Champions League.

The Körfez Sports Club began competing in the 2nd volleyball league in the 1999-00 Season. In 2001 it became the Saint Joseph Sports Club and in 2003 it was renamed Arkas Saint Joseph.

The club's name was changed to Arkas Sports Club at the Board of Directors meeting in May 2005. The club's primary sports branch is volleyball, but it is also active in sailing and bridge.

Arkas Sports Club is a young club that aims to increase the number of sports branches in which it participates every year.

Mission
To make a contribution to the development of Turkish sports and to help raise up the next generation of healthy sports enthusiasts, people that will be good examples for society. Operating with this goal in mind, our club's goal is to build a strong base of players by discovering young talent in Izmir and in Turkey, train players so that they can play for Turkish National Teams at the highest level and to revive the love of volleyball, which has begun to decline.

Vision
To build a base of sportsmen and women that have adopted Arkas's philosophy and that can achieve victories in Turkish Leagues and in Europe and ultimately become champions. To contribute to the success of the Turkish National Teams.

Staff
President: Lucien Arkas 
Vice President: Bernard Arkas 
Member of the board: Cenk Değer 
Member of the board - Sports Coordinator: Yaşar Ergün 
Member of the board - Press Secretary: Uğur Özden
Member of the board - International Relations Supervisor: Bahadır Osman
Member of the board: Atıf İnönü

Team

First Team Squad
This is the Arkas Spor team for the 2016–17 Turkish Men's Volleyball League season.

Head coach:  Glenn Hoag

Honours

International competitions
  CEV Champions League
 Final Four (1): 2011–12
  CEV Challenge Cup
 Champions (1): 2008–09

National competitions
 Turkish League
 Champions (4): 2006, 2007, 2013, 2015
  Turkish Cup
 Champions (2): 2009, 2011

References

External links
Official Website
Coaching Stuff

Volleyball clubs in İzmir
Sports teams in İzmir
Volleyball clubs established in 2001
2001 establishments in Turkey